In mathematics, a unit square is a square whose sides have length .

Cartesian coordinates

That is, a unit square is the Cartesian product , where  denotes the closed unit interval.

Complex coordinates
The unit square can also be thought of as a subset of the complex plane, the topological space formed by the complex numbers.

Rational distance problem

It is not known whether any point in the plane is a rational distance from all four vertices of the unit square.

See also 
 Unit circle
 Unit cube
 Unit sphere

References

External links
 

1 (number)
Types of quadrilaterals
Squares in number theory